Las Lomas High School (LLHS) is a public high school in Walnut Creek, California, United States. It was founded in 1951 by the Acalanes Union High School District, and opened its doors in the fall of 1952 to its first graduating class. Las Lomas was the second of five schools built within the Acalanes Union High School District. It is a traditional high school serving grades 9-12, and has a history of both athletic and educational excellence. The school has a strong college preparatory program as well as many extracurricular programs. The colors of the school are maroon and gold and the school mascot is the Knight. Las Lomas had 1,482 students in 2011-12. The school has a 96.4% graduation rate, and about 97% of its graduates attend college. U.S. News & World Report ranked Las Lomas #372 in the nation in 2013. It was voted a National Blue Ribbon School in 2008.

History 
Las Lomas High School was founded in 1951 as part of the Acalanes Union High School District (AUHSD). Situated in the suburban city of Walnut Creek, the high school has been closely integrated with the local community, with the majority of its students being residents of Walnut Creek.

Extracurricular programs 
Las Lomas is well-known for its breadth of student organizations and programs. As reflected by its slogan, the high school has a strong tradition of community service, presenting the annual Knight Service Award to students who actively volunteer. Furthermore, many students are active members of community service organizations such as Key Club, Interact Club, and Helping Hands Club. Las Lomas is also home to student-led DEI organizations such as Asian Student Union, Black Student Union, Middle East and North Africa (MENA) Club, Latines Unides, Multiracial Club, Armenian Club, Filipino Dance Club, and Student Diversity Club. Debate societies, including Speech and Debate (a class itself), Model United Nations, and Mock Trial are also popular with students. The school also offers a wide variety of award-winning STEM and academic clubs, such as HOSA, Quiz Bowl, and Physics Olympiad. Further, semi-academic clubs such as the Art Club, Chess Club, Investors Club, and Space Club are also offered.

The prestigious California Scholarship Federation is Las Lomas's school-wide honor society. Other honor societies on campus include the National STEM Honor Society.

Athletic facilities 
New tennis courts were completed during the 2011-2012 school year. George DeKlotz Stadium, Las Lomas' new football stadium and track, was finished in 2005. At the same time, the baseball field reopened after a year of remodeling. A year prior, Las Lomas completed construction on a new softball field. Other facilities include a swimming pool, gym, small gym, five tennis courts, locker rooms, and a weight room.

Notable alumni
Steve Alexakos, professional football player
Akhil Reed Amar, constitutional law expert
Vikram Amar, constitutional law expert
Kasey Carlson, swimmer
Corey Duffel, professional skateboarder
Tom Garfinkel, president and CEO of the Miami Dolphins
Kyle Gass, comedian
Bobby Griffith
Brandon Harkins, professional golfer
Kira Kazantsev, Miss America
Craig Klass, Olympic water polo silver medalist
Mariya Koroleva, Olympic athlete
Cass McCombs, singer/songwriter
Markie Post, actress, Night Court
Jeff Richards, cast member of MadTV and Saturday Night Live
Katharine Ross, actress
Mike Senese, television host, Rock and Roll Acid Test, Catch It Keep It
Tracee Talavera, Olympic gymnast

References

External links
Las Lomas High School website
Las Lomas High School parent reviews
Acalanes Union High School District website

Educational institutions established in 1951
High schools in Contra Costa County, California
Walnut Creek, California
Public high schools in California
1951 establishments in California